This is a list of seasons played by Middlesbrough Football Club in English and European football, from 1883, when the club first entered the FA Cup, to the most recent completed season. Middlesbrough Football Club were founded on 18 February 1876, by members of Middlesbrough Cricket Club. For the first years of their existence Middlesbrough participated in competitions such as the Sheffield Cup and the Cleveland Association Challenge Cup. The club have won only one major trophy in their professional history, the Football League Cup in 2004. Most of Middlesbrough's League existence has been in the top two tiers; they were relegated to the Third Division twice in 1966 and 1986, but each time they bounced back as runners-up the following season.

This list details the club's achievements in all competitions, and the top scorers for each season. Records of competitions such as the North Riding Senior Cup are not included due to them being played against lower league opposition and reserve sides.

Seasons

Overall
Seasons spent at Level 1 of the football league system: 61
Seasons spent at Level 2 of the football league system: 50
Seasons spent at Level 3 of the football league system: 2
Seasons spent at Level 4 of the football league system: 0

As of 2022–23 season.

Key

League Results
Div = Division
Pos = Final position
Pld = Matches played
W = Matches won
D = Matches drawn
L = Matches lost
GF = Goals for
GA = Goals against
Pts = Points

Divisions
NL = Northern Football League
Div 1 = Football League First Division
Div 2 = Football League Second Division
Div 3 = Football League Third Division
Prem = Premier League
NVL = Northern Victory League
NERL = North Eastern Regional League
LN = Football League North
Champ = EFL Championship
n/a = Not applicable

Cup Results
Q = Qualifying round
Q1 = Qualifying round 1
Q2 = Qualifying round 2
Q3 = Qualifying round 3
Q4 = Qualifying round 4
Q5 = Qualifying round 5
R1 = Round 1
R2 = Round 2
R3 = Round 3
R4 = Round 4
R5 = Round 5
R6 = Round 6

Cup Results (cont.)
QF = Quarter-finals 
SF = Semi-finals
RU = Runners-up
WN = Winners
GS = Group Stage
L16 = Last 16

Notes

References

Seasons
 
Middlesbrough F.C.